Santa Maria Novella is a church in Florence, Italy, situated opposite, and lending its name to, the city's main railway station. Chronologically, it is the first great basilica in Florence, and is the city's principal Dominican church.

The church, the adjoining cloister, and chapter house contain a multiplicity of art treasures and funerary monuments. Especially famous are frescoes by masters of Gothic and early Renaissance. They were financed by the most important Florentine families, who ensured themselves funerary chapels on consecrated ground.

History

This church was called S. Maria Novella ('New') because it was built on the site of the 9th-century oratory of Santa Maria delle Vigne. When the site was assigned to the Dominican Order in 1221, they decided to build a new church and adjoining cloister. The church was designed by two Dominican friars, Fra Sisto Fiorentino and Fra Ristoro da Campi. Building began in the mid-13th century (about 1276), and lasted 80 years, ending under the supervision of Friar Iacopo Talenti with the completion of the Romanesque-Gothic bell tower and sacristy. In 1360, a series of Gothic arcades were added to the façade; these were intended to contain sarcophagi. The church was consecrated in 1420.

On a commission from the wealthy Florentine wool merchant Giovanni di Paolo Rucellai, Leon Battista Alberti designed the upper part of the inlaid green marble of Prato, also called 'serpentino', and white marble façade of the church (1456–1470). He was already famous as the architect of the Tempio Malatestiano in Rimini, but even more for his seminal treatise on architecture De re aedificatoria. Alberti had also designed the façade for the Rucellai Palace in Florence.

Alberti attempted to bring the ideals of humanist architecture, proportion and classically inspired detailing to bear on the design, while also creating harmony with the already existing medieval part of the façade. The combined façade can be inscribed by a square; many other repetitions of squares can be found in the design. His contribution consists of a broad frieze decorated with squares, and the full upper part, including the four white-green pilasters and a round window, crowned by a pediment with the Dominican solar emblem, and flanked on both sides by enormous S-curved volutes.
The four columns with Corinthian capitals on the lower part of the façade were also added. The pediment and the frieze are clearly inspired by antiquity, but the S-curved scrolls in the upper part are new and without precedent in antiquity. Solving a longstanding architectural problem of how to transfer from wide to narrow storeys, the scrolls (or variations of them), found in churches all over Italy, all draw their origins from the design of this church.

The frieze below the pediment carries the name of the patron: IOHAN(N)ES ORICELLARIUS PAU(LI) F(ILIUS) AN(NO) SAL(UTIS) MCCCCLXX (Giovanni Rucellai son of Paolo in the year of salvation 1470).

Interior
The vast interior is based on a basilica plan, designed as an Egyptian cross (T-shaped) and is divided into a nave, two aisles set with windows and a short transept. The large nave is 100 metres long and gives an impression of austerity. The piers are of compound form and have Corinthian columns supporting pointed Gothic arches above which is a clerestory of ocular windows above which rises a ribbed, pointed quadrupartite vault.  The ribs and arches are all black and white polychrome.

There is a trompe-l'œil effect by which towards the apse the nave seems longer than its actual length because the piers between the nave and the aisles are progressively closer, nearer to the chancel.

Many of the windows have stained glass dating from the 14th and 15th century, such as 15th century Madonna and Child and St. John and St. Philip (designed by Filippino Lippi), both in the Filippo Strozzi Chapel. Some stained glass windows have been damaged in the course of centuries and have been replaced. The one at the west end, a depiction of the Coronation of Mary, dates from the 14th century, and is based on a design of Andrea di Bonaiuto da Firenze.

The pulpit, commissioned by the Rucellai family in 1443, was designed by Filippo Brunelleschi and executed by his adopted son Andrea Cavalcanti. This pulpit has a particular historical significance, since it was the pulpit from which Father Tommaso Caccini denounced Galileo Galilei's defense of Copernican heliocentrism.

The Holy Trinity, situated almost halfway along the left aisle, is a pioneering early Renaissance work of Masaccio, showing his new ideas about perspective and mathematical proportions. Its meaning for the art of painting can easily be compared to the importance of Brunelleschi for architecture and Donatello for sculpture. The patrons were the judge and his wife, members of the Lenzi family, here depicted kneeling. The cadaver tomb below carries in Italian the epigram: "I was once what you are, and what I am you will become".

Of particular note in the right aisle is the Tomba della Beata Villana, a monument by Bernardo Rossellino executed in 1451. In the same aisle, are located tombs of bishops of Fiesole, one by Tino di Camaino and another by Nino Pisano.

Tornabuoni Chapel

The chancel (or the Cappella Tornabuoni) contains series of famous frescoes painted from 1485 to 1490 by Domenico Ghirlandaio whose apprentice was the young Michelangelo. The frescoes represent themes from the lives of the Virgin and John the Baptist. They contain portrayals of several members of important Florentine families. The vaults have roundels with paintings of the Evangelists. On the rear wall are the paintings Saint Dominic burns the Heretical Books and Saint Peter's Martyrdom, the Annunciation, and Saint John goes into the Desert.

The stained-glass windows were made in 1492 by the Florentine artist Alessandro Agolanti, known also as Il Bidello, and were based on cartoons by Ghirlandaio.

The bronze crucifix on the main altar is by Giambologna (16th century).

Filippo Strozzi Chapel
The Filippo Strozzi Chapel is situated on the right side of the main altar. The series of frescoes by Filippino Lippi depict the lives of Apostle Philip and the Apostle Saint James the Great and were completed in 1502. On the right wall is the fresco St Philip Driving the Dragon from the Temple of Hieropolis and in the lunette above it, the Crucifixion of St Philip. On the left wall is the fresco St John the Evangelist Resuscitating Druisana and in the lunette above it The Torture of St John the Evangelist. Adam, Noah, Abraham and Jacob are represented on the ribbed vault. Behind the altar is the tomb of Strozzi with a sculpture by Benedetto da Maiano (1491).

Gondi Chapel

This chapel, designed by Giuliano da Sangallo, is situated on the left side of the main altar and dates from the end of the 13th century. Here, on the rear wall, is the famous wooden Crucifix by Brunelleschi, one of his very few sculptures. The legend goes that he was so disgusted by the "primitive" Crucifix of Donatello in the Florence's church of Santa Croce that he made this one. The vault contains fragments of frescoes by 13th-century Greek painters. The polychrome marble decoration was applied by Giuliano da Sangallo (c. 1503). The stained-glass window and dates from the 20th century.

Cappella Strozzi di Mantova
The Cappella Strozzi di Mantova is situated at the end of the left transept. The frescoes were commissioned from Nardo di Cione (1350–1357) by Tommaso Strozzi, an ancestor of Filippo Strozzi. The frescoes are inspired by Dante's Divine Comedy: Last Judgment (on the back wall; including a portrait of Dante), Hell (on the right wall) and paradise (on the left wall). The main altarpiece of The Redeemer with the Madonna and Saints was done by Nardo di Cione's brother, Andrea di Cione, better known as Orcagna. The large stained-glass window on the back was made from a cartoon by the two brothers.

Della Pura Chapel
The Della Pura Chapel is situated north of the old cemetery. It dates from 1474 and was constructed with Renaissance columns. It was restored in 1841 by Gaetano Baccani. On the left side there is a lunette with a 14th-century fresco Madonna and Child with St Catherine. On the front altar there is a wooden crucifix by Baccio da Montelupo (1501).

Rucellai Chapel
The Rucellai Chapel, at the end of the right aisle, dates from the 14th century. Besides the tomb of Paolo Rucellai (15th century) and the marble statue of the Madonna and the Child by Nino Pisano, it houses several art treasures such as remains of frescoes by the Maestro di Santa Cecilia (end 13th – beginning 14th century). The panel on the left wall, the Martyrdom of St Catherine, was painted by Giuliano Bugiardini (possibly with assistance from Michelangelo). The bronze tomb, in the centre of the floor, was made by Lorenzo Ghiberti in 1425.

Bardi Chapel
The Bardi Chapel, the second chapel on the right of the apse, was founded by Riccardo Bardi and dates from early 14th century. The high-relief on a pillar on the right depicts St Gregory blessing Riccardo Bardi. The walls show us some early 14th-century frescoes attributed to Spinello Aretino. The Madonna del Rosario on the altar is by Giorgio Vasari (1568)

Sacristy
The sacristy, at the end of the left aisle, was built as the Chapel of the Annunciation by the Cavalcanti family in 1380. It houses, after a recent period of fourteen years of cleaning and renovation, the enormous painted Crucifix with the Madonna and John the Evangelist, an early work by Giotto. The sacristy is also embellished by a glazed terra cotta and a marble font, masterpieces by Giovanni della Robbia (1498). The cupboards were designed by Bernardo Buontalenti in 1593. The paintings on the wall are ascribed to Vasari and other contemporary Florentine painters. The large Gothic window with three mullions at the back wall dates from 1386 and was based on cartoons by Niccolò di Pietro Gerini

Spanish Chapel

The Spanish Chapel (or Cappellone degli Spagnoli) is the former chapter house of the convent. It is situated at the north side of the green Cloister (Chiostro Verde). It was commissioned by Buonamico (Mico) Guidalotti as a chapter house for the Dominican Order. Construction started c. 1343 and was finished in 1355. The Guidalotti chapel was later called "Spanish Chapel", because Cosimo I assigned it to Eleonora of Toledo and her Spanish retinue. Within the Spanish Chapel there is a smaller Chapel of the Most Holy Sacrament.

The Spanish Chapel was decorated from 1365 to 1367 by Andrea di Bonaiuto, also known as Andrea da Firenze. As the chapel was built for the Dominicans, depictions of Saint Dominic are found in most of the frescos. The large fresco on the right wall depicts an Allegory of the Active and Triumphant Church and of the Dominican order. It is especially interesting because in the background it shows a large pink building that some think may provide some insight into the original designs for Florence Cathedral by Arnolfo di Cambio (before Brunelleschi's dome was built). However, such an interpretation is fantasy since the Duomo was never intended to be pink, nor to have the bell tower at the rear. This fresco also contains portraits of pope Benedict IX, cardinal Friar Niccolò Albertini, count Guido di Poppi, Arnolfo di Cambio and the poet Petrarch.

The frescoes on the other walls represent scenes from the lives of Christ and St Peter on the entry wall (mostly ruined due to the later installation of a choir), The Triumph of St Thomas Aquinas and the Allegory of Christian Learning on the left wall, and the large "Crucifixion with the Way to Calvary and the Descent into Limbo" on the archway of the altar wall.

The four-part vault contains scenes of Christ's resurrection, the navicella, the Ascension, and Pentecost. The five-panelled Gothic polyptych that was probably originally made for the chapel's altar, depicting the Madonna Enthroned with Child and Four Saints by Bernardo Daddi dates from 1344 and is currently on display in a small museum area reached ed through glass doors from the far end of the cloister. Together, the complex iconography of the ceiling vault, walls, and altar combine to communicate the message of Dominicans as guides to salvation.

Rectangular in shape, towards the west it has a scarsella containing the altar and a marble crucifix by Domenico Pieratti from the early seventeenth century, donated in 1731 by Gian Gastone de' Medici.

Architecture

Vasari was the architect, commissioned in 1567 by Grand Duke Cosimo I, for the first remodelling of the church, which included removing its original rood screen and loft, and adding six chapels between the columns. The second remodelling was designed by Enrico Romoli, and was carried out between 1858 and 1860.

The square in front the church was used by Cosimo I for the yearly chariot race (Palio dei Cocchi). This custom existed between 1563 and late in the 19th century. The two Obelisks of the Corsa dei Cocchi marked the start and the finish of the race. They were set up to imitate an antique Roman Circus Maximus. The obelisks rest on bronze tortoises, made in 1608 by the sculptor Giambologna.

Astronomical Instruments

An armillary sphere (on the left) and an astronomical quadrant with gnomon (on the right) were added to the end blind arches of the lower façade by Ignazio Danti, astronomer of Cosimo I, in 1572. The armilliary sphere was intended to determine the vernal equinox and this was observed for the first time publicly in 1574. The gnomon threw shadows on the astronomical quadrant to tell the time according to the transalpine, Italian and Bohemian methods.

Thanks to these instruments, the astronomer was able to calculate exactly the discrepancy between the true solar year and the Julian calendar, then still in use since its promulgation in 46 BC. By demonstrating his studies in Rome to Pope Gregory XIII, he obtained the realignment of the days and the promulgation of the new Gregorian calendar, jumping into a night in 1582 from 4 October to 15 October.

However, the construction was not completed due to the death of his patron, the Grand Duke Cosimo I.

List of artworks
Artists who produced items for the church include:
Sandro Botticelli – early work, a nativity scene above the door (Adoration of the Magi)
Baccio D'Agnolo – wood carvings
Bronzino – the Miracle of Jesus
Filippo Brunelleschi – The Crucifix (between 1410 and 1425)
Tino da Camaino – Bust of St. Antoninus (in terra cotta); the Tomb of the Bishop of Fiesole
Nardo di Cione – frescoes of the Divine Judgment
Duccio – Rucellai Madonna
Lorenzo Ghiberti – tombstone of Leonardo Dati (1423)
Domenico Ghirlandaio – frescoes (late 15th century) in the Tornabuoni Chapel, design of the stained-glass window 
Filippino Lippi – frescoes in the Strozzi Chapel, depicting the life of Philip the Apostle; stained glass window
Benedetto da Maiano – the Tomb of Filippo Strozzi (1491) at the backside of the Strozzi Chapel.
Giacomo Marchetti – Martyrdom of Saint Laurence.
Masaccio – ''Holy Trinity''
Nino Pisano – Madonna with Child (1368)
Bernardo Rossellino – Monument to the Beata Villana (1451)
Santi di Tito – Lazarus Raised from Death
Paolo Uccello – frescoes in the cloisters
Giorgio Vasari – Madonna of the Rosary (1568)

Notable prioresses
Saint Agnes of Montepulciano

List of burials
Joseph II of Constantinople (1439)
Domenico Ghirlandaio (1494)
Niccolò Gaddi- cardinal (1552)

See also
 Roman Catholic Marian churches

References

Sources

External links

Opera per Santa Maria Novella official homepage
Santa Maria Novella, Florence virtual reality movie and pictures on commercial tourist website ItalyGuides.it created by ComPart Multimedia in Rome 
Santa Maria Novella at private tourist website Museumsinflorence.com

Maria Novella
Maria Novella
Renaissance architecture in Florence
Fresco paintings in Florence
Gothic paintings
Paintings by Giotto
Dominican churches in Italy
15th-century Roman Catholic church buildings in Italy
Leon Battista Alberti church buildings
Dominican Order in Florence